Results from Norwegian football in 1933.

Class A of local association leagues
Class A of local association leagues (kretsserier) is the predecessor of a national league competition.

1In the following season, Glommendalen local association changed its name to Glåmdal.
2In the following season, Nordmøre og Romsdal local association was split into Nordmøre and Romsdal.
3In the following season, Troms local association was split into Troms Innland and Troms.
4In the following season, Finnmark local association was split into Vest-Finnmark, Midt-Finnmark and Aust-Finnmark.

Norwegian Cup

Final

Northern Norwegian Cup

Final

National team

Sources:

References

 
Seasons in Norwegian football